Backhaus is a German surname. Notable people with the surname include:

Georg F. Backhaus (born 1955), German agricultural scientist specializing in horticulture and phytomedicine
George Henry Backhaus (1811–1882), German-Australian Catholic priest
Gerd Backhaus (born 1942), German soccer player
Hans-Georg Backhaus (born 1929), German critic of political economy and philosopher
Heiner Backhaus (born 1982), German soccer player and manager
Helmuth M. Backhaus (1920–1989), German actor, screenwriter and film director
Robin Backhaus (born 1955), American swimmer
Robin Backhaus (German swimmer) (born 1989), German freestyle swimmer
Till Backhaus (born 1959), German politician
Wilf K. Backhaus (1946–2009), Canadian game designer, business professor, and lawyer
Wilhelm Backhaus (1884–1969), German pianist

German-language surnames